The Hussite Trilogy is a historical fantasy series of novels by Polish author Andrzej Sapkowski. It consists of three books: The Tower of Fools, Warriors of God and Light Perpetual. It is set in the Lands of the Bohemian Crown (mostly Silesia and Bohemia) during the Hussite Wars (1419–1434). 

In addition to English, the series has been translated into numerous languages, including Czech, Slovakian, Russian, Serbian, German, Ukrainian and Spanish. The trilogy was published by Orbit in the US and Gollancz in the UK with the translation being handled by David French, who had previously worked with Sapkowski on The Witcher series. 

The main protagonist of the series is Reinmar von Bielau (Polish: Reinmar z Bielawy, i.e., Reinmar of Bielawa) known as Reynevan. He is a doctor and magician, and eventually a spy for the Hussites. Of nationality, he defines himself as "Silesian", rather than Czech, Pole or German. He studied in Prague.

When asked about the creation of the trilogy, Sapkowski explained that he considered The Witcher saga of Geralt well-rounded and did not want to write any sequels. Therefore, he decided to write something completely different and chose the subgenre of historical fantasy. Further, he chose the setting of Bohemia and the Hussite Wars because, as he said, he frequently visited that area, and since the Hussite Wars is an important period in these lands, there are plenty of books on the subject. Also, the Hussite Wars are closely related to the Polish history of the period.

References

 
Polish historical novels
Polish fantasy novels
Fantasy novel trilogies
Fiction set in the 1420s
Fiction set in the 1430s
Hussite Wars in popular culture
21st-century Polish novels